= Zhumagul Nusupova =

Soviet-Kyrgyz politician (1931–2015)

Zhumagul Baltabaevna Nusupova (Russian: Жумагуль Балтабаевна Нусупова; 17 May 1931, Frunze — 28 November 2015, Bishkek) was a Soviet and Kyrgyzstani politician (Communist).

She served as Minister of Culture from 1980 to 1985.
